Austria competed at the 1998 Winter Paralympics in Nagano, Japan. 34 competitors from Austria won 34 medals including 7 gold, 16 silver and 11 bronze and finished 8th in the medal table.

See also 
 Austria at the Paralympics
 Austria at the 1998 Winter Olympics

References 

Austria at the Paralympics
1998 in Austrian sport
Nations at the 1998 Winter Paralympics